Allister Wilbert Surette (born September 21, 1961) is a Canadian politician and currently the President and Vice-Chancellor of Université Sainte-Anne. He represented the electoral district of Argyle in the Nova Scotia House of Assembly from 1993 to 1998 as a member of the Nova Scotia Liberal Party.

Early life and education
Surette was born in Lower West Pubnico, Yarmouth County, Nova Scotia. He graduated with a Bachelor of Science from Dalhousie University and a Bachelor of Education from Saint Mary's University in 1984. He was a high school teacher by career.

Political career
Surette entered provincial politics in the 1993 election, defeating Progressive Conservative cabinet minister Neil LeBlanc in the Argyle riding. Surette served in the Executive Council of Nova Scotia as Minister of Human Resources, Minister in charge of the Youth Secretariat and the Office of Acadian Affairs, and Minister of Housing and Municipal Affairs. In a re-match from 1993, Surette was defeated by LeBlanc when he ran for re-election in 1998.

Collège de l'Acadie
Between 1998 and 2003, he was chief executive officer of the Collège de l'Acadie, which was the only French-language community college in Nova Scotia.

Université Sainte-Anne
In 2003, Surette became vice-president of Development and Partnerships of Université Sainte-Anne.

In December 2003, Surette was appointed facilitator by the Minister of Fisheries and Oceans to lead discussions between herring fishers from Prince Edward Island, New Brunswick, and their respective provincial governments to seek solutions to the conflict in the herring fishery in the southern Gulf of St. Lawrence.

In March 2006, Surette was appointed by the Canadian Minister of Fisheries and Oceans to facilitate an independent process to resolve a dispute between fishers from Prince Edward Island and the Magdalen Islands regarding lobster fishing on MacLeod's Ledge.

In November 2010, Surette was named president and Vice-Chancellor of Université Sainte-Anne. He took office as president on July 1, 2011.

In October 2019, Surette was appointed Chair of the Association of Atlantic Universities, an advocacy organization working on behalf of the region's 16 universities.

During Surette's tenure, the university achieved a record full-time student population of 540 students for the 2019–2020 academic year, far exceeding the previous record of 481 students in 2008.

During the third term of Surette's presidency at Sainte-Anne, in 2022, the faculty union engaged in a strike that was the longest university strike in Nova Scotia's history and one of the longest-ever in Canadian history.

Other work
From 1999 to 2003, Surette was a member of the Board of Trustees of du Réseau des cégeps et collèges francophones du Canada (RCCFC), serving as chair from September 2000 to November 2002.

In December 1999, Surette was elected chairman of the executive committee for the 2004 Acadian World Congress. Surette had previously served as President of the organizing committee and then served as chairman of the board of directors.

In November 2000, Surette was appointed to a provincial advisory committee created help meet the needs of the Acadian community.

From 2007 to 2018, Surette served as a member of the board of directors for Assumption Life.

In May 2011, Surette was appointed as a member of the board of trustees for the Voluntary Sector Professional Capacity Trust, a trust to support developing human resource policies, business planning and assessing the needs of an organization.

In July 2012, Surette was one of three members appointed to serve on an expert panel reviewing the Regional Development Authority model.

In February 2014, Surette was appointed to the inaugural Board of Directors of the Western Regional Enterprise Network (WREN).

In May 2014, Surette was appointed transition co-ordinator to oversee the dissolution of the town of Bridgetown into the Municipality of the County of Annapolis.

In December 2018, Surette was appointed to the inaugural Board of Directors of Research Nova Scotia.

In December 2019, Surette was appointed chair of the organizing committee for the 2024 Acadian World Congress.

In October 2020, Surette was named the Federal Special Representative, a neutral third-party who will communicate with and rebuild trust between commercial and Indigenous fishers in Southwestern Nova Scotia.

Recognition and awards
In 2004, Surette was awarded the Prix du Père Léger Comeau.

In October 2008, Surette was awarded the Order of La Pléiade which recognizes parliamentarians and community leaders for outstanding work in advancing francophone causes.

In 2010, Surette was made an honorary member of the Executive Council by the Lieutenant Governor of Nova Scotia.

In October 2019, Surette was one of seven people named to the Order of the Francophones of America which recognizes commitment to the French language and culture in the Americas.

Electoral record

|-
 
|Progressive Conservative
|Neil LeBlanc
|align="right"|3,028
|align="right"|53.60
|align="right"|+9.32
|-

|-
 
|New Democratic Party
|Dianne Crowell
|align="right"|651
|align="right"|11.50
|align="right"|+7.77

|}

|-

|-
 
|Progressive Conservative
|Neil LeBlanc
|align="right"|2,633
|align="right"|44.28
|align="right"|-19.86
|-
 
|New Democratic Party
|Dee Dee Daigle
|align="right"|222
|align="right"|3.73
|align="right"|-0.68
|}

References

Living people
Dalhousie University alumni
Nova Scotia Liberal Party MLAs
Members of the Executive Council of Nova Scotia
People from Yarmouth County
Saint Mary's University (Halifax) alumni
1961 births